This is a list of frigates in service with the French Navy as of 2023:

First rank frigates
The French Navy does not use the term "destroyer"; thus, some large ships of the first rank (like ) are designated "frigates", though they are registered as destroyers (with hull numbers "Dxxx").

  class - 2 ships (primary air defence role)
D620 Forbin
D621 Chevalier Paul

 Aquitaine class - 8 ships (6 primary anti-submarine warfare (ASW) /land attack role; 2 primary air defence/ASW role)
 D650 Aquitaine 
 D652 Provence
 D653 Languedoc
 D654 Auvergne
 D655 Bretagne
 D651 Normandie 
 D656 Alsace (primary air defence/ASW role)
 D657 Lorraine (primary air defence/ASW role)

Second rank frigates 

Two La Fayette class (La Fayette and Courbet) warships were upgraded, with the incorporation of a hull-mounted sonar and the  modernization of various other systems. A third ship of the class, Aconit, began the same modernization process in February 2023.

  class - 5 ships (general purpose/escort role)
F710 La Fayette
F711 Surcouf
F712 Courbet
F713 Aconit
F714 Guépratte

  class - 6 ships (sovereignty protection/patrol role for French overseas territories)
F730 Floréal
F731 Prairial
F732 Nivôse
F733 Ventôse
F734 Vendémiaire
F735 Germinal

See also
 French Navy
 List of French sail frigates
 List of French steam frigates
 List of French modern frigates

France
Frigate